is a passenger railway station located in the town of Masaki, Ehime Prefecture, Japan. It is operated by the private transportation company Iyotetsu.

Lines

Layout
The station consists oft opposed side platforms connected by a level crossing. The station is unattended.  During most of the day, trains arrive every fifteen minutes.

History
The station was opened on July 18, 1910.

Surrounding area
The street in front of the station is a prefectural road, but the road is not wide. There used to be a few shops in front of the station, but most of them have gone out of business and are now residential areas. In front of the station is the Matsuyama City Agricultural Cooperative Branch and the Okada Ekimae bus stop (the Iyo Okada bus stop is also located far away). Matsumae Municipal Okada Junior High School and Okada Post Office are located on the northwest side.

See also
 List of railway stations in Japan

References

External links

Iyotetsu Gunchū Line
Railway stations in Ehime Prefecture
Railway stations in Japan opened in 1910
Masaki, Ehime